Chirinkotan (Japanese 知林古丹島; Chirinkotan-tō) is an uninhabited volcanic island located in the centre of the Kuril Islands chain in the Sea of Okhotsk in the northwest Pacific Ocean. Its name is derived from the Ainu language for "mudslide".

Geology
Chirinkotan is at the far end of a volcanic chain extending nearly 50 km west of the central part of the main Kuril Islands arc.
Reports of a 1955 eruption are unconfirmed. The shores of the island are steep cliffs, making landing by small boat impossible.

History

Chirinkotan has had no permanent habitation. Claimed by the Empire of Russia, sovereignty was passed to the Empire of Japan per the Treaty of Saint Petersburg along with the rest of the Kuril Islands. The island was formerly administered as part of Shumushu District of Nemuro Subprefecture of Hokkaidō. After World War II, the island came under the control of the Soviet Union, and is now administered as part of the Sakhalin Oblast of the Russian Federation.

Fauna

In the spring and early summer crested, whiskered, and parakeet auklet nest on the island.

See also
List of volcanoes in Russia

References

External links
 Sakhalin Oblast

Further reading 
 Gorshkov, G. S. Volcanism and the Upper Mantle Investigations in the Kurile Island Arc. Monographs in geoscience. New York: Plenum Press, 1970. 
 Krasheninnikov, Stepan Petrovich, and James Greive. The History of Kamtschatka and the Kurilski Islands, with the Countries Adjacent. Chicago: Quadrangle Books, 1963. 
 Rees, David. The Soviet Seizure of the Kuriles. New York: Praeger, 1985.  
 Takahashi, Hideki, and Masahiro Ōhara. Biodiversity and Biogeography of the Kuril Islands and Sakhalin. Bulletin of the Hokkaido University Museum, no. 2-. Sapporo, Japan: Hokkaido University Museum, 2004.

Notes

Active volcanoes
Islands of the Sea of Okhotsk
Islands of the Russian Far East
Stratovolcanoes of Russia
Islands of the Kuril Islands
Uninhabited islands of Russia
Uninhabited islands of the Pacific Ocean
Calderas of Russia
Volcanoes of the Kuril Islands
Mountains of the Kuril Islands
Holocene stratovolcanoes